is a former Japanese singer, actress, and radio personality. Tsugunaga joined Hello! Project as a member of Hello! Project Kids at the age of 10 and later became part of the girl groups Berryz Kobo and Buono! Following Berryz Kobo's hiatus, she became the playing manager of Country Girls. In 2017, Tsugunaga retired from entertainment to become a kindergarten teacher.

Career

2002-2004: Hello! Project Kids and ZYX

In 2002, Tsugunaga auditioned for Hello! Project Kids with the song "Koi wo Shicchaimashita!" by Tanpopo. Her audition tape was aired on Morning Musume's variety show Hello! Morning. She was placed in the group with 14 other girls. In the same year, she starred in the movie Koinu Dan no Monogatari as the main character, Mao Morishita.

In 2003, Tsugunaga appeared in the music video for Miki Fujimoto's "Boogie Train '03." She also became a member of the subgroup ZYX along with Mari Yaguchi from Morning Musume, Erika Umeda, Maimi Yajima, Saki Shimizu, and Megumi Murakami. They released their debut single, "Iku ZYX! Fly High" on August 6, 2003, followed by "Shiroi Tokyo" on December 10, 2003. Later, in 2004, she participated in singing "All for One & One for All!", a collaboration single released by all Hello! Project artists under the name "H.P. All Stars."

2004-2015: Berryz Kobo and Buono!

In 2004, Tsugunaga was one of the eight girls from Hello! Project Kids were selected to form Berryz Kobo. Berryz Kobo debuted on March 3, 2004, with the single "Anata Nashi de wa Ikite Yukenai", and she was one of the lead singers of the group. From 2009 until 2014, Tsugunaga also hosted a radio show titled "Momoko Tsugunaga from Berryz Kobo's Pri-Pri-Princess."

Continuing with her "Momochi" personality, Tsugunaga released a solo song and music video called "Momochi! Yurushite Nyan Taiso", which was released as a B-side to Berryz Kobo's 29th single, "Cha Cha Sing."

In 2007, Tsugunaga also became part of the subgroup Buono! with Miyabi Natsuyaki and Airi Suzuki from Cute. The group formed to perform the opening and ending songs for the anime Shugo Chara! They released their first single, "Honto no Jibun", on October 31, 2007. After the show's end, Buono continued on as a side project until its disbandment in 2017.

2015-2017: Country Girls and retirement

In 2014, Berryz Kobo announced they would end activities the following year. After Berryz Kobo went on hiatus, Tsugunaga took on the role as the "playing manager" for the girl group Country Girls, a revival of a Hello! Project group formerly under the name Country Musume.

On November 5, 2016, at Shinjuku ReNY, during Country Girls' second anniversary event, Tsugunaga announced that she would retire from the entertainment industry the following year to become a kindergarten teacher. To commemorate her graduation, a compilation CD album titled  was released on June 21, 2017, with songs selected by fan vote. Tsugunaga held her final concert on June 30, 2017, in an outdoor venue at Odaiba, exactly 15 years after her debut in Hello! Project Kids. 8,000 people attended the concert, including Berryz Kobo and Cute.

Personal life

Public image

During Berryz Kobo's later years, Tsugunaga became known as the "cutesy character" of the group and with her mannerisms and twintail hairstyle. She was often referred to by the nickname  in media and press. After Berryz Kobo went on hiatus, she began playing down her "Momochi" image and stopped wearing her hair in twintails, citing that she has grown up.

Education
Tsugunaga majored in education and graduated in 2014.

Discography

Albums

DVD

Bibliography

Photobooks 
  (June 19, 2007)
  (March 19, 2008)
  (November 21, 2008, Wani Books)
  (August 21, 2009, Wani Books)
  (October 20, 2010, Wani Books)
  (March 6, 2012, Wani Books)

Photo-essays
   (Photographic essay, June 22, 2013, Wani Books)

Filmography

Film

Television

Theater

Music video

Radio

References

External links
 Official Hello! Project profile
 Official blog (Ameba)
 Country Girls Official blog (Ameba)
 
 
 

1992 births
Berryz Kobo members
People from Kashiwa
Japanese women pop singers
Buono! members
Hello! Project Kids members
Japanese idols
Japanese child singers
Japanese child actresses
Living people
ZYX (pop group) members
Musicians from Chiba Prefecture
21st-century Japanese singers
21st-century Japanese actresses
21st-century Japanese women singers